Angelina Jolie is an American actress and filmmaker. As a child, she made her screen debut in the comedy film Lookin' to Get Out (1982), acting alongside her father Jon Voight. Eleven years later, she appeared in her next feature, the low-budget film Cyborg 2 (1993), a commercial failure. She then starred as a teenage hacker in the science fiction thriller Hackers (1995), which went on to be a cult film despite performing poorly at the box-office. Jolie's career prospects improved with a supporting role in the made-for-television film George Wallace (1997), for which she received the Golden Globe Award for Best Supporting Actress – Television Film. She made her breakthrough the following year in HBO's television film Gia (1998). For her performance in the title role of fashion model Gia Carangi, she won the Golden Globe Award for Best Actress – Television Film.

Jolie was in Pushing Tin (1999), a critical and commercial failure; however, her next film, The Bone Collector (1999), emerged as a commercial success. In the drama Girl, Interrupted (1999), Jolie played a sociopathic mental patient, a role which won her a Golden Globe Award and an Academy Award for Best Supporting Actress. A role opposite Nicolas Cage in the heist film Gone in 60 Seconds (2000) proved to be her highest-grossing to that point. Jolie achieved worldwide recognition as the eponymous archaeologist in Lara Croft: Tomb Raider (2001), an action film based on the Tomb Raider video game series. Despite negative reviews, the film had the biggest opening weekend for a film featuring an action heroine. This was followed by roles in two box-office failures—the erotic thriller Original Sin (2001) and the romantic comedy Life or Something Like It (2002). Jolie reprised the role of Lara Croft in the sequel Lara Croft: Tomb Raider – The Cradle of Life (2003).

In 2004, Jolie lent her voice to the animated feature Shark Tale, followed by the role of an assassin in the commercially successful action comedy Mr. & Mrs. Smith (2005), opposite Brad Pitt. She then portrayed Mariane Pearl in the drama A Mighty Heart (2007), and lent her voice to the computer-animated film Kung Fu Panda (2008). The action thriller Wanted (2008), which saw her in a supporting role, proved to be a commercial success. Her next appearance was as Christine Collins in the drama Changeling (2008), which earned her an Academy Award for Best Actress nomination. This was followed by lead roles in two of 2010's top-grossing thrillersSalt and The Tourist. In 2011, she directed the romantic drama In the Land of Blood and Honey, which depicted a love story set during the Bosnian War, and appeared in the animation sequel Kung Fu Panda 2. Jolie's biggest commercial success, as of 2014, came with the dark fantasy film Maleficent (2014), which grossed over $758 million worldwide, and starred her in the eponymous role. Her subsequent directorial ventures were the war dramas Unbroken (2014) and First They Killed My Father (2017).

Acting credits

Film

Television

Video games

Music videos

Filmmaking credits

See also 

 List of awards and nominations received by Angelina Jolie

References

External links 
 
 
 Angelina Jolie at Rotten Tomatoes

Actress filmographies
Director filmographies
American filmographies
Filmography